This is a list of films that have been or are banned in India. This list includes titles that were refused a rating by the Central Board of Film Certification (CBFC) initially or permanently. The list also includes films whose release or production was or are blocked by the central or a state government, or by a legal institution. Also included are films that faced a virtual ban, after theatre owners were compelled to stop screening by non-government groups.

Nationwide

Regional

Provinces of British India 
 1921 – Bhakta Vidur: Banned in Karachi and Madras for political reasons. the film came right after Jallianwala Bagh massacre and Rowlatt Act. The character Vidura was moulded upon personality of Mahatma Gandhi.
 1939 – Thyagabhoomi: Banned in Madras, 22 weeks after release for supporting Congress and the Independence movement.

Andhra Pradesh and Telangana 
 2006 – The Da Vinci Code: It was banned after some Christians and Muslim extremists who took offence protested. Later, the ban was lifted by the Andhra Pradesh High Court.
 2011 – Aarakshan: It was banned on 11 August 2011 due to concerns that it may hurt weaker sections of the society. On 14 August 2011, the ban was revoked.
 2013 – Jabardasth: It was banned on 2013 due to copyright infringement of Yashraj Studios' movie Band Baaja Baaraat.

Assam 
 1952 – Runumi: The film was suddenly banned by then Government of Assam headed by chief minister Bishnuram Medhi due to some unknown reason.
 2005 – Tango Charlie: The film was allegedly poorly researched and defamed the Bodo community.

Chhattisgarh 
 2015 – MSG-2 The Messenger: The film was banned in Chhattisgarh for hurting sentiments of Adivasi community.

Goa 
 2006 – The Da Vinci Code: It was banned considering "public sentiments" after protests by Christian organisations.

Gujarat 
 2005 – Chand Bhuj Gaya: This film which was set with the Godhra train burning as a backdrop was not released in Gujarat.
 2006 – Fanaa: It faced an unofficial ban due to the role of Aamir Khan, the lead actor, in the Narmada Bachao Andolan. Supreme Court of India directed that theatres wanting to screen the film should be provided police protection. But, most theatre owners decided not to screen it.
 2007 – Parzania: Parzania faced an unofficial ban after Bajrang Dal coaxed theatre owners to stop screening the film. Bajrang Dal activist Babu Bajrangi, who was later incarcerated for murder, conspiracy and spreading hatred in Naroda Patiya massacre of Gujarat riots, had the opinion that it may disrupt communal harmony in the state.
 2009 – Firaaq: Firaaq was allegedly not released by many theatres due to political pressure because it depicted the 2002 Gujarat riots. But, theatre owners cited a revenue sharing dispute.
 2017 – Padmaavat: Following controversies and threats of violence made by Rajput caste organization Shri Rajput Karni Sena.

Haryana 
 2017 – Padmaavat: Following controversies and threats of violence made by Rajput caste organization Shri Rajput Karni Sena.

Jharkhand 
 2015 – MSG-2 The Messenger: Film was banned in Jharkhand for hurting sentiments of Adivasi community (Tribal community).

Kerala 
 2012 – Pithavinum Puthranum: The film originally completed in 2012 is awaiting approval from the Censor Board as of January 2015. The film was reported based on a book by Sister Jesme and the Sister Abhaya murder case.
 2013 – Papillio Buddha: The Film is one of the most controversial films at the Festival. It was banned in India for its scenes of violence, and for its scathing critique of Gandhi's legacy. It is set among a community of Dalits, regarded as 'untouchables' in India, where they face caste oppression, discrimination and displacement.
 2015 – Chayam Poosiya Veedu: The film was not given a certificate since there was a nude scene in it.

Madhya Pradesh 
 2008 – Jodhaa Akbar: The film was banned after protests from the Rajput community over Jodha Bai's depiction as Akbar's wife. The Supreme Court later lifted the ban.
 2015 – MSG-2 The Messenger: The film was banned as it was an insult to Adivasis (Tribals).

Maharashtra 
 2008 – Deshdrohi: The film was banned in November fearing breakdown of law and order in the state. The film depicted the attacks against North Indians in the state. The ban was lifted in January 2009 by the Bombay High Court.

Nagaland 
 2006 – The Da Vinci Code: It was banned for portraying Jesus Christ and Christians in an 'objectionable' manner.

Punjab 
 2006 – The Da Vinci Code: Chief Minister Amarinder Singh banned the film after an appeal by the Punjabi Roman Catholic leaders.
 2011 – Aarakshan: On 11 August 2011, the film was banned for hurting the feelings of the weaker sections of the society. But, the ban was lifted on 14 August 2011 after a preview screening.
 2013 – Oh My Pyo Ji: The Punjab and Haryana High Court stayed the release of the on the request of a producer due to the dispute between two producers.
 2013 – Sadda Haq: On 4 April, Punjabi film Sadda Haq was banned in Punjab by the state government. The ban was lifted by the Supreme Court on 28 April 2013, after a special screening in the court.
 2014 – Kaum De Heere: A movie based on Indira Gandhi's bodyguards Satwant Singh and Beant Singh was banned by Censor Board. Eventually the movie was released on YouTube
 2015 – The Mastermind Jinda Sukha: A movie based on Harjinder Singh Jinda and Sukhdev Singh Sukha was banned following controversies. The movie was released on YouTube
 2015 – MSG: The Messenger: The Punjab government banned Gurmeet Ram Rahim Singh's film MSG: The Messenger in the state.
 2015 – Nanak Shah Fakir:  In April 2015, Punjab government and Chandigarh administration suspended the screening of Nanak Shah Fakir for two months.
 2015 – MSG-2 The Messenger: On the release day, the film was banned by Mansa administration in Punjab but ban was lifted later. However, movie theatres owners refused to screen movie in Punjab citing law and order problems.
 2016 – Santa Banta Pvt Ltd: The film was banned by the state government for portraying Sikhs in a denigrating and defamatory manner.
 2016 – Dharam Yudh Morcha: A movie based on the life of Sant Jarnail Singh Bhindranwale also involving events like the Anandpur Sahib resolution, Bluestar, 1978 Sikh Nirankari clashes, and the role of Major Subeg Singh as an army officer. The movie was banned which led to its release at YouTube.
 2017 – Toofan Singh: A movie based on life of Jugraj Singh Toofan. The movie was banned which led to its release on YouTube.
2020 – Shooter: The film was banned because it was a biography of gangster Sukha Kahlwan.

Rajasthan 
 2008 – Jodhaa Akbar: The film was not released after theatre owners received letters written in blood from Karni Sena.
 2017 – Padmaavat: Following controversies and threats of violence made by Rajput caste organization Shri Rajput Karni Sena.

Tamil Nadu 
 1987 – Ore Oru Gramathiley: It was banned for criticizing caste based reservations. The Supreme Court of India later allowed its release.
 2006 – The Da Vinci Code: It was banned after concerns that it may hurt religious sentiments. Later, Madras High Court allowed its screening.
 2011 – Dam 999: It was banned for allegedly spreading fear among people regarding the Mullaperiyar Dam.
 2013 – Vishwaroopam: The film was banned after objections were expressed by Muslim groups regarding the portrayal of the Muslim community in a bad light. The movie was later released after seven scenes were cut.

Uttar Pradesh 
 2007 – Aaja Nachle: The movie was banned because the lyrics of the title song was allegedly humiliating the Dalits. The lyrics were later changed. The ban was lifted later after the producers apologized.
 2008 – Jodhaa Akbar: The film was banned fearing breach of peace after protests from a Rajput group. The Supreme Court later lifted the ban.
 2011 – Aarakshan: It had been banned due to objectionable dialogues. Later, Supreme Court lifted the ban. The film was based on the topic of reservations in jobs and education.

West Bengal 
 1992 – City of Joy: The shooting was banned in Calcutta for a while due to negative portrayal of the city.
 2013 – Kangal Malsat: In February 2013, a revising committee of the CBFC refused to pass the film citing excessive use of abusive language, sexuality and frivolous approach in portraying of social movements. The film was cleared later by the Film Certification Appellate Tribunal after some edits.

See also 
Censorship in India
Cinema of India
List of books banned in India
List of banned films
Film censorship
Moral police

References 

Film censorship in India

India
Banned
 List India